The 2022–23 season is Teuta's 93rd season in their history of the Albanian Superliga and came in as the defending champions. Along with the Superliga, the club will also participate in the Albanian Supercup, Albanian Cup, and the Champions League qualifying stage. The season will begin in August 2022 and end in May 2023.

First team squad 

.
Goals & Appearances since before season started.

Transfers

Transfers in

Transfers out

Loans out

Friendlies

Competitions

Albanian Supercup

Albanian Superliga

League table

Matches

Albanian Cup

UEFA Champions League

First qualifying round

UEFA Europa Conference League

Second qualifying round

Statistics

Appearances and goals

|-
! colspan=16 style=background:#dcdcdc; text-align:center| Goalkeepers

|-
! colspan=16 style=background:#dcdcdc; text-align:center| Defenders

|-
! colspan=16 style=background:#dcdcdc; text-align:center| Midfielders

|-
! colspan=16 style=background:#dcdcdc; text-align:center| Forwards

|-
! colspan=16 style=background:#dcdcdc; text-align:center| Players transferred out during the season

Goalscorers

References 

 

2022–23
Tirana
Tirana
Tirana